Barren Island was a small place with seven families in the Placentia district. The earliest post office was at Little Placentia in 1864. The nearest telegraph station was at South Island where the Reid-Newfoundland Steamers called weekly, in 1911. The first Waymaster was Eliza Shea in 1886. The island had a population of 220 in 1911.

The name has been shown as Baron's and also Baron Island in 1889 and Bar Haven in 1912.

See also 
 List of ghost towns in Newfoundland and Labrador

Ghost towns in Newfoundland and Labrador